Park Seong-jun (born 23 April 1969) is a South Korean politician from the Democratic Party. He represents Jung–Seongdong B district in the National Assembly since 2020.

Before politics, he worked as a television presenter for the Korean Broadcasting System

References 

1969 births
Living people
Members of the National Assembly (South Korea)
Minjoo Party of Korea politicians
21st-century South Korean politicians
South Korean television presenters
Korean Broadcasting System people